A booby trap is a device or setup that is intended to kill, harm or surprise a human or another animal. It is triggered by the presence or actions of the victim and sometimes has some form of bait designed to lure the victim towards it. The trap may be set to act upon trespassers that enter restricted areas, and it can be triggered when the victim performs an action (e.g., opening a door, picking something up, or switching something on). It can also be triggered by vehicles driving along a road, as in the case of improvised explosive devices (IEDs).

Booby traps should not be confused with mantraps which are designed to catch a person. Lethal booby traps are often used in warfare, particularly guerrilla warfare, and traps designed to cause injury or pain are also sometimes used by criminals wanting to protect drugs or other illicit property, and by some owners of legal property who wish to protect it from theft. Booby traps which merely cause discomfort or embarrassment are a popular form of practical joke.

Etymology
The Spanish word  translates to "stupid, daft, naïve, simple, fool, idiot, clown, funny man, one who is easily cheated" and similar pejorative terms. Variations of this word exist in other languages (such as Latin), with their meaning being "to stammer".

In approximately 1590, the word began appearing in the English language as booby, meaning "stupid person, slow bird". The seabird in question was the genus Sula, with their common name being boobies. These birds have large flat feet and wide wingspans for marine habitats but are clumsy and slow on shore making them easy to catch. The birds are also known for landing aboard seagoing vessels, whereupon they have been eaten by the crew.

The phrase booby trap originally applied to schoolboy pranks, but took on its more sinister connotation during World War I. The term "booby trap" gives rise to the idea that an individual with the misfortune to be caught in the trap does so because the individual is a "booby", or that an individual who is caught in the trap thereby becomes a "booby".

The word itself now has formal usage and a legal definition, as per the Protocol on Mines, Booby-Traps and Other Devices.

Military booby traps

A military booby trap may be designed to kill or injure a person who activates its trigger, or employed to reveal the location of an enemy by setting off a signalling device. Most, but not all, military booby traps involve explosives.

There is no clear division between a booby trap and buried conventional land mines  triggered by a tripwire or directional mine. Other, similar devices include spring-guns and mechanisms such as the SM-70 directional antipersonnel mine.

What distinguishes a booby trap is that its activation is intended to be unexpected to its victim.  Thus booby trap design is widely varied, with traps or their trigger mechanisms often hidden.  Frequently at least part of the device is improvised from standard ordnance, such as an artillery shell, grenade, or high explosive. However, some mines have features specifically designed for incorporation into booby traps and armies have been equipped with a variety of mass-produced triggering mechanisms intended to be employed in booby traps deployment.

Part of the skill in placing booby traps lies in exploiting natural human behaviors such as habit, self-preservation, curiosity or acquisitiveness.  A common trick is to provide victims with a simple solution to a problem, for example, leaving only one door open in an otherwise secure building, thereby luring them straight toward the firing mechanism.

An example that exploits an instinct for self-preservation was used in the Vietnam War. Spikes known as punji sticks were hidden in grassy areas. When fired upon soldiers instinctively sought to take cover by throwing themselves down on the ground, impaling themselves on the spikes.

Attractive or interesting objects are frequently used as bait. For example, troops could leave behind empty beer bottles and a sealed wooden packing case with "Scotch Whisky" marked on it before leaving an area. The rubble-filled packing case might be resting on top of an M5 or M142 firing device, connected to some blocks of TNT or to some C4 explosive stuffed into the empty fuze pocket of a mortar shell. Alternatively, the weight of the packing case might simply be holding down the arming lever of an RGD-5 grenade with a zero-delay fuze fitted and the pin removed. Either way, when the case is moved, the booby trap detonates, killing or severely injuring anyone in the immediate area. Many different types of bait object can be used. For example, soldiers may be tempted to kick a beer can lying on the ground as they walk past it. However the can, partially filled with sand to add weight, may be resting on top of an M5 pressure-release firing device screwed into a buried M26 grenade.

Many purpose-built booby-trap firing devices exist such as the highly versatile M142 universal firing device (identical to the British L5A1 or Australian F1A1), or Yugoslavian UMNOP-1 which allow a variety of different ways of triggering explosives e.g. via trip wire (either pulling it or releasing the tension on it), direct pressure on an object (e.g. standing on it), or pressure release (lift/shift something) etc.

Almost any item can be booby trapped in some way. For example, booby trapping a flashlight is a classic tactic: a flashlight already contains most of the required components. First of all, the flashlight acts as bait, tempting the victim to pick it up. More importantly, it is easy to conceal a detonator, some explosives, and batteries inside the flashlight casing. A simple electrical circuit is connected to the on/off switch. When the victim attempts to turn the flashlight on to see if it works, the resulting explosion blows their hand or arm off and possibly blinds them.

The only limits to the intricacy of booby traps are the skill and inventiveness of the people placing them. For example, the "bait object" (e.g. a cash box in a corner of the room) which lures victims into the trap may not in fact be booby trapped at all. However, the furniture which must be pushed away in order to get to the bait has a wire attached, with an M142 firing device connected to a 155mm artillery shell on the other end of it. 

A booby trap may be of any size. However, as a general rule the size of most explosive booby traps use between 250 g and 1 kg of explosive. Since most booby traps are rigged to detonate within a metre of the victim's body, this is adequate to kill or severely wound.

As a rule, booby traps are planted in any situation where there is a strong likelihood of them being encountered and triggered by the targeted victims. Typically, they are planted in places that people are naturally attracted to or are forced to use. The list of likely placement areas includes:

 the only abandoned houses left standing in a village, which may attract enemy soldiers seeking shelter.
 a door, drawer or cupboard inside a building that someone will open without thinking of what might be connected to it. If a door is locked, this makes people believe there could be something valuable behind it so they are more likely to kick it open, with fatal results.
 vehicles abandoned by the roadside, perhaps with some kind of victim "bait" left on the back seat such as a suitcase or large cardboard box.
 natural choke-points, such as the only footbridge across a river, which people must use whether they want to or not.
 important strategic installations such as airfields, railway stations and harbour facilities, all of which the invading forces will want to occupy and use.
 anything of use or value that people would naturally want to possess or which makes them curious to see what is inside it, e.g. a crate of beer, a pistol, a jerry can, a flashlight, discarded army rucksack or even a picture torn out of a pornographic magazine.

A booby trap does not necessarily incorporate explosives in its construction. Examples include the punji sticks mentioned above and deadfall traps which employ heavy objects set up to fall on and crush whoever disturbs the trigger mechanism. However, setting non-explosive booby traps is labour-intensive and time-consuming, they are harder to conceal and they are less likely to do serious damage. In contrast, booby traps containing explosives are much more destructive: they will either kill their victims or severely wound them.

Effects
In addition to the obvious ability of booby traps to kill or injure, their presence has other effects such as these:

 demoralize soldiers as booby traps kill or maim comrades
 keep soldiers continually stressed, suspicious and unable to relax because it is difficult for them to know which areas, buildings or objects are safe
 slow down troop movement as soldiers are forced to sweep areas to see if there are more booby traps.
 make soldiers cautious instead of aggressive and confident
 create no-go areas (real or imagined) after a booby trap has killed or wounded someone
 cause a section or platoon to have to stop in order to deal with casualties, thus slowing and delaying those troops
 create confusion and disorientation as a prelude to an ambush

Booby traps are indiscriminate weapons. Like anti-personnel mines, they can harm civilians and other unsuspecting noncombatants (during and after the conflict) who are unaware of their presence. The use against civilians is prohibited by the Protocol on Mines, Booby-Traps and Other Devices, and the protocol also prohibits boobytrapping e.g. the wounded or dead, medical equipment, food, and drink.

History
A type of booby trap was referred to in an 1839 news story in The Times.

During the Vietnam War, motorcycles were rigged with explosives by the National Liberation Front and abandoned.  U.S. soldiers would be tempted to ride the motorcycle and thus trigger the explosives. In addition, NLF soldiers would rig rubber band grenades and place them in huts that US soldiers would likely burn. Another popular booby trap was the "Grenade in a Can", a grenade with the safety pin removed in a container and a string attached, sometimes with the grenade's fuse mechanism modified to give a much shorter delay than the four to seven seconds typical with grenade fuses. The NLF soldiers primarily used these on doors and attached them to tripwires on jungle paths.

The CIA and Green Berets countered by booby trapping the enemy's ammunition supplies, in an operation code-named "Project Eldest Son". The propellant in a rifle or machine-gun cartridge was replaced with high explosive. Upon being fired, the sabotaged round would destroy the gun and kill or injure the shooter. Mortar shells were similarly rigged to explode when dropped down the tube, instead of launching properly. This ammunition was then carefully re-packed to eliminate any evidence of tampering, and planted in enemy munitions dumps by covert insertion teams. A sabotaged round might also be planted in a rifle magazine or machine-gun belt and left on the body of a dead NLF soldier, in anticipation that the deceased's ammo would be picked up and used by his comrades. No more than one sabotaged round would be planted in any case, magazine, or belt of ammunition, to reduce the chances of the enemy finding it no matter how diligently they inspected their supplies. False rumors and forged documents were circulated to make it appear that the Communist Chinese were supplying the NLF with defective weapons and ammunition.

Northern Ireland
During the "Troubles" in Northern Ireland, booby trap bombs were often used by the Provisional Irish Republican Army (IRA) and the Irish National Liberation Army (INLA) to kill British Army soldiers and Royal Ulster Constabulary officers. A common method was attaching the bomb to a vehicle so that starting or driving it would detonate the explosive. According to the Sutton Index of Deaths, 180 deaths during the Troubles were the result of booby trap bombs, the vast majority of them laid by the Provisional IRA.

Middle East
During the Al-Aqsa Intifada, some Arab-Palestinian groups made wide use of booby traps.

The largest use of booby traps (between 2000 and 2005, the period of the Intifada) was in the Battle of Jenin during Operation Defensive Shield where a large number (1000-2000 according to Palestinian militant captured in Jenin during the battle
) of explosive devices were planted by insurgents. Booby traps had been laid in the streets of both the camp and the town, ready to be triggered if a foot snagged a tripwire or a vehicle rolled over a mine.  Some of the bombs were huge, containing as much as 250 lb (110 kg) of explosives. To counter the booby traps, anti-tank and anti-personnel mines the IDF sent armored D9 bulldozers to clear the area out of any explosive device and booby trap planted. The IDF D9 bulldozers were heavily armored and thus did not sustain any damage from the explosions, which were triggered by them as they pushed forwards.
Eventually, a dozen D9 bulldozers went into action, razing the center of the refugee camp and forcing the Palestinian militants inside to surrender.

Gallery
As a rule, most purpose-made military booby-trap firing devices contain some form of spring-loaded firing pin designed to strike a percussion cap connected to a detonator at one end. The detonator is inserted into an explosive charge e.g. C4 or a block of TNT. Triggering the booby trap (e.g. by pulling on a trip-wire) releases the cocked firing pin which flips forward to strike the percussion cap, firing both it and the attached detonator. The resulting shock-wave from the detonator sets off the main explosive charge.

Civilian use and legal ramifications

Booby traps have been applied as defensive weapons against unwelcome guests or against non-military trespassers, but most jurisdictions consider the practice illegal. Many US states have laws specifically against the setting of booby traps and case precedent generally holds the property owner criminally and civilly liable. The highest precedent for this is People v. Ceballos, 12 Cal. 3d 470 (1974), which was heard before the Supreme Court of California which gave the following remarks when rendering its verdict: Allowing persons, at their own risk, to employ deadly mechanical devices imperils the lives of children, firemen and policemen acting within the scope of their employment, and others. Where the actor is present, there is always the possibility he will realize that deadly force is not necessary, but deadly mechanical devices are without mercy or discretion. Such devices are silent instrumentalities of death. They deal death and destruction to the innocent as well as the criminal intruder without the slightest warning. The taking of human life [or infliction of great bodily injury] by such means is brutally savage and inhuman.

Computer viruses

Many computer viruses take the form of booby traps in that they are triggered when an unsuspecting user performs an apparently ordinary action such as opening an email attachment.

Practical jokes

Instead of being used to kill, maim or injure people, booby traps can also be used for entertainment. Practical joke booby traps are typically disguised as everyday items such as cigars or packets of chewing gum, nuts or other snack items. When the victims attempts to use the item, the trap is triggered. Two of the best known examples of this are the exploding cigar and dribble glass; others include the Snake Nut Can and shocking gum. Booby traps can also be constructed out of household or workplace items and be triggered when the victim performs a common action. Examples of this include loosening the bolts in a chair so that it collapses when sat upon, or placing a bucket of water on top of a partly open door so that when the door is fully opened, the bucket tips onto the victim. A variant is the water bucket which when "thrown" at the target, is full of confetti.

See also

 Area denial
 Anti-personnel
 Anti-handling device
 Cartridge trap
 Combat engineer
 DEMIRA Deutsche Minenräumer
 Improvised explosive device
 Mercury switch
 Microswitch
 Mantrap
 Spring-gun
 Booby prize
 Protocol on Mines, Booby-Traps and Other Devices

References

External links
 US Army Training Film from 1944 (humorous cartoon with a serious message)
 Mines & Boobytrap devices - British guide dated 1943
 How not to get caught by mines and boobytraps - US warning guide dated 1944, and still relevant
 How not to get caught by Vietnamese boobytraps - US guide dated 1969
 Army Field Manual FM531 Boobytraps - US guide dated 1965
 Photos of booby trap devices used in Angola
 Booby trap concepts and detection techniques
 The Straight Dope: What's the origin of "booby trap"? 
Photos of injuries inflicted by explosive boobytraps (Warning: graphic images)
The M142 multi-function boobytrap firing device (technical specifications) 
Cut-away diagram and technical specifications of M5 pressure release boobytrap firing device
Photo of M5 pressure release boobytrap firing device connected to a one pound block of TNT explosive
Paolo Borsellino's road side bombing trigered by a booby trapped door bell

Area denial weapons
Guerrilla warfare tactics
Practical joke devices